The 2012 Copa do Brasil (officially the Copa Kia do Brasil 2012 for sponsorship reasons) was the 24th edition of the Copa do Brasil. It began on March 7 and ended on July 11. The competition was contested by 64 teams, either qualified through their respective state championships (54) or by the CBF Rankings (10). Clubs that qualify for the 2012 Copa Libertadores (like the current champion, Vasco da Gama) did not take part because of scheduling conflicts.

The cup winner qualifies for the 2013 Copa Libertadores.

Format
The competition is a single elimination knockout tournament featuring two-legged ties. In the first two rounds, if the away team wins the first match by 2 or more goals, it progresses straight to the next round avoiding the second leg. The away goals rule is also used in the Copa do Brasil. The winner qualifies for the 2013 Copa Libertadores, which prevents a team from winning the Copa do Brasil twice in a row.

Qualified teams

Qualified by state championships and other competitions
54 spots in the tournament are destinated to all the 27 State federations to indicate either one, two or three clubs, depending on their status in CBF State ranking. Criteria may vary, but usually state federations indicate clubs with best records in the state championships or other special competitions organized by such institutions.

Teams in italics may qualify for the Copa Libertadores.

Qualified by CBF club ranking
Ten spots are reserved for the top 10 clubs in CBF club ranking, excluding those qualified by state competitions and clubs playing in 2012 Copa Libertadores.

Symbols:

CP: Points for 2011 Copa do Brasil (1st round 1 pt, 2nd round 2 pts, 3rd round 3 pts, quarterfinals 5 pts, semifinals 10 pts, runners-up 20 pts, winner 30 pts) LP: Minimum points for Campeonato Brasileiro (41 for Série A,21 for Série B, 1 for Série C and D)PP: Additional points for position (Série A and B: 1st 19 points, ..., 20th 0 Points; Série C: 1st 19 points, ..., 10th 10 points, 11th-20th 0 point, Série D: 1st 9 points,...9th 1 Point)    
(Q) Qualified via ranking; (TQ) Qualified via ranking or via state competition; (SQ) Qualified via state competition; (E) Eligible for qualification via state competition; (I) Ineligible for qualification via state competition; (DQ) Ineligible because qualified for Copa Libertadores.   
Notes:
 Santos qualified for 2012 Copa Libertadores via 2011 Copa Libertadores.
 Vasco da Gama qualified for 2012 Copa Libertadores via 2011 Copa do Brasil.
 Corinthians, Fluminense, Flamengo and Internacional qualified for 2012 Copa Libertadores via 2011 Campeonato Brasileiro Série A.

Bracket
Teams that play in their home stadium in the first leg are marked with †.
{{64TeamBracket|legs=2
| seeds = no
| compact = yes
| compact-final = yes
| nowrap = yes
|RD1=First Phase
|RD2=Second Phase
|RD3=Round of 16
|RD4=Quarterfinals
|RD5=Semifinals
|RD6=Finals

| RD1-team01 =  Palmeiras | RD1-team02 =  Coruripe †
| RD1-score01-1 = 1 | RD1-score02-1 = 0
| RD1-score01-2 = 3 | RD1-score02-2 = 0

| RD1-team03 =  América de Natal †| RD1-team04 =  Horizonte †
| RD1-score03-1 = 0 | RD1-score04-1 = 2
| RD1-score03-2 = 2 (2) | RD1-score04-2 = 0 (4)

| RD1-team05 =  Ceará| RD1-team06 =  Gama †
| RD1-score05-1 = 2 | RD1-score06-1 = 0
| RD1-score05-2 = - | RD1-score06-2 = -

| RD1-team07 =  Paraná| RD1-team08 =  Luverdense †
| RD1-score07-1 = 2 | RD1-score08-1 = 2
| RD1-score07-2 = 2 | RD1-score08-2 = 0

| RD1-team09 =  Cruzeiro | RD1-team10 =  Rio Branco †
| RD1-score09-1 = 6 | RD1-score10-1 = 0
| RD1-score09-2 = - | RD1-score10-2 = -

| RD1-team11 =  Chapecoense | RD1-team12 =  São Mateus †
| RD1-score11-1 = 1 | RD1-score12-1 = 2
| RD1-score11-2 = 3 | RD1-score12-2 = 1

| RD1-team13 =  Atlético Paranaense | RD1-team14 =  Sampaio Corrêa †
| RD1-score13-1 = 1| RD1-score14-1 = 2
| RD1-score13-2 = 1| RD1-score14-2 = 0

| RD1-team15 =  Criciúma | RD1-team16 =  Madureira †
| RD1-score15-1 = 2| RD1-score16-1 = 0
| RD1-score15-2 = - | RD1-score16-2 = -

| RD1-team17 =  Grêmio | RD1-team18 =  River Plate †
| RD1-score17-1 = 3 | RD1-score18-1 = 2
| RD1-score17-2 = 3 | RD1-score18-2 = 1

| RD1-team19 =  Ipatinga | RD1-team20 =  Real Noroeste †
| RD1-score19-1 = 2 | RD1-score20-1 = 0
| RD1-score19-2 = - | RD1-score20-2 = -

| RD1-team21 =  Náutico | RD1-team22 =  Santa Cruz-RN †
| RD1-score21-1 = 3 | RD1-score22-1 = 1
| RD1-score21-2 = - | RD1-score22-2 = -

| RD1-team23 =  Fortaleza | RD1-team24 =  Comercial-PI †
| RD1-score23-1 = 3 | RD1-score24-1 = 2
| RD1-score23-2 = 3 | RD1-score24-2 = 0

| RD1-team25 =  Bahia | RD1-team26 =  Auto Esporte-PB † 
| RD1-score25-1 = 3 | RD1-score26-1 = 0
| RD1-score25-2 = - | RD1-score26-2 = -

| RD1-team27 =  Remo | RD1-team28 =  Real † 
| RD1-score27-1 = 0 | RD1-score28-1 = 0
| RD1-score27-2 = 3 | RD1-score28-2 = 0

| RD1-team29 =  Portuguesa | RD1-team30 =  Cuiabá † 
| RD1-score29-1 = 1 | RD1-score30-1 = 1
| RD1-score29-2 = 4 | RD1-score30-2 = 0

| RD1-team31 =  Juventude | RD1-team32 =  Operário-PR †
| RD1-score31-1 = 4 | RD1-score32-1 = 0
| RD1-score31-2 = - | RD1-score32-2 = -

| RD1-team33 =  São Paulo | RD1-team34 =  Independente †
| RD1-score33-1 = 1 | RD1-score34-1 = 0
| RD1-score33-2 = 4 | RD1-score34-2 = 0

| RD1-team35 =  Bahia de Feira | RD1-team36 =  Aquidauanense †
| RD1-score35-1 = 0 | RD1-score36-1 = 1
| RD1-score35-2 = 2 | RD1-score36-2 = 0

| RD1-team37 =  Atlético Goianiense | RD1-team38 =  Gurupi †
| RD1-score37-1 = 1 | RD1-score38-1 = 0
| RD1-score37-2 = 4 | RD1-score38-2 = 2

| RD1-team39 =  Ponte Preta | RD1-team40 =  Sapucaiense †
| RD1-score39-1 = 0 | RD1-score40-1 = 0
| RD1-score39-2 = 5 | RD1-score40-2 = 2

| RD1-team41 =  Atlético Mineiro | RD1-team42 =  CENE †
| RD1-score41-1 = 3 | RD1-score42-1 = 1
| RD1-score41-2 = - | RD1-score42-2 = -

| RD1-team43 =  Santa Cruz | RD1-team44 =  Penarol †
| RD1-score43-1 = 2 | RD1-score44-1 = 2
| RD1-score43-2 = 1 | RD1-score44-2 = 2

| RD1-team45 =  América Mineiro | RD1-team46 =  Boavista †
| RD1-score45-1 = 0 | RD1-score46-1 = 0
| RD1-score45-2 = 2 | RD1-score46-2 = 1

| RD1-team47 =  Goiás | RD1-team48 =  Paulista †
| RD1-score47-1 = 3 | RD1-score48-1 = 2
| RD1-score47-2 = 3 | RD1-score48-2 = 0

| RD1-team49 =  Coritiba | RD1-team50 =  Nacional †
| RD1-score49-1 = 0 | RD1-score50-1 = 0
| RD1-score49-2 = 2 | RD1-score50-2 = 0

| RD1-team51 =  ASA | RD1-team52 =  Santa Quitéria †
| RD1-score51-1 = 3 | RD1-score52-1 = 2
| RD1-score51-2 = 2 | RD1-score52-2 = 1

| RD1-team53 =  Sport| RD1-team54 =  4 de Julho †
| RD1-score53-1 = 2 | RD1-score54-1 = 0
| RD1-score53-2 = - | RD1-score54-2 = -

| RD1-team55 =  Paysandu | RD1-team56 =  Espigão †
| RD1-score55-1 = 3 | RD1-score56-1 = 1
| RD1-score55-2 = - | RD1-score56-2 = -

| RD1-team57 =  Botafogo | RD1-team58 =  Treze †
| RD1-score57-1 = 1 | RD1-score58-1 = 1
| RD1-score57-2 = 1 (3) | RD1-score58-2 = 1 (2)

| RD1-team59 =  Guarani | RD1-team60 =  Brasiliense †
| RD1-score59-1 = 0 | RD1-score60-1 = 2
| RD1-score59-2 = 3 | RD1-score60-2 = 0

| RD1-team61 =  Vitória | RD1-team62 =  São Domingos †
| RD1-score61-1 = 0 | RD1-score62-1 = 0
| RD1-score61-2 =  2| RD1-score62-2 = 0

| RD1-team63 =   ABC| RD1-team64 =  Trem †
| RD1-score63-1 = 5 | RD1-score64-1 = 0
| RD1-score63-2 = - | RD1-score64-2 = -

| RD2-team01 =  Palmeiras | RD2-team02 =  Horizonte †
| RD2-score01-1 = 3 | RD2-score02-1 = 1
| RD2-score01-2 = - | RD2-score02-2 = -

| RD2-team03 =  Ceará † | RD2-team04 =  Paraná
| RD2-score03-1 = 2 | RD2-score04-1 = 2
| RD2-score03-2 = 1 | RD2-score04-2 = 1

| RD2-team05 =  Cruzeiro | RD2-team06 =  Chapecoense †
| RD2-score05-1 = 1 | RD2-score06-1 = 1
| RD2-score05-2 = 4 | RD2-score06-2 = 1

| RD2-team07 =  Atlético Paranaense | RD2-team08 =  Criciúma †
| RD2-score07-1 = 2 | RD2-score08-1 = 1
| RD2-score07-2 = 5 | RD2-score08-2 = 1

| RD2-team09 =  Grêmio | RD2-team10 = Ipatinga †
| RD2-score09-1 = 1 | RD2-score10-1 = 0
| RD2-score09-2 = 3 | RD2-score10-2 = 0

| RD2-team11 =  Náutico | RD2-team12 =  Fortaleza †
| RD2-score11-1 = 0 | RD2-score12-1 = 4
| RD2-score11-2 = 2 | RD2-score12-2 = 1

| RD2-team13 =  Bahia | RD2-team14 =  Remo †
| RD2-score13-1 = 1 | RD2-score14-1 = 2
| RD2-score13-2 = 4 | RD2-score14-2 = 0

| RD2-team15 =  Portuguesa | RD2-team16 =  Juventude †
| RD2-score15-1 = 0 | RD2-score16-1 = 2
| RD2-score15-2 = 4 | RD2-score16-2 = 0

| RD2-team17 =  São Paulo | RD2-team18 =  Bahia de Feira †
| RD2-score17-1 = 5 | RD2-score18-1 = 2
| RD2-score17-2 =- | RD2-score18-2 = -

| RD2-team19 =  Atlético Goianiense † | RD2-team20 =  Ponte Preta †
| RD2-score19-1 = 2 | RD2-score20-1 = 1
| RD2-score19-2 = 1 (3) | RD2-score20-2 = 2 (4)

| RD2-team21 =  Atlético Mineiro| RD2-team22 =  Penarol †
| RD2-score21-1 = 5 | RD2-score22-1 = 0
| RD2-score21-2 = - | RD2-score22-2 = -

| RD2-team23 =  América Mineiro †| RD2-team24 =  Goiás| RD2-score23-1 = 0 | RD2-score24-1 = 0
| RD2-score23-2 = 3 | RD2-score24-2 = 4

| RD2-team25 =  Coritiba | RD2-team26 =  ASA †
| RD2-score25-1 = 0 | RD2-score26-1 = 1
| RD2-score25-2 = 3 | RD2-score26-2 = 0

| RD2-team27 =   Sport| RD2-team28 =  Paysandu †
| RD2-score27-1 = 1 | RD2-score28-1 = 2
| RD2-score27-2 = 1 | RD2-score28-2 = 4

| RD2-team29 =  Botafogo | RD2-team30 =  Guarani †
| RD2-score29-1 = 2 | RD2-score30-1 = 1
| RD2-score29-2 = 0 | RD2-score30-2 = 0

| RD2-team31 =  Vitória | RD2-team32 =  ABC †
| RD2-score31-1 = 1 | RD2-score32-1 = 1
| RD2-score31-2 = 3 | RD2-score32-2 = 2

| RD3-team01 =  Palmeiras | RD3-team02 =  Paraná †
| RD3-score01-1 = 2 | RD3-score02-1 = 1
| RD3-score01-2 = 4 | RD3-score02-2 = 0

| RD3-team03 =  Cruzeiro | RD3-team04 =  Atlético Paranaense †
| RD3-score03-1 = 0 | RD3-score04-1 = 1
| RD3-score03-2 = 1 | RD3-score04-2 = 2

| RD3-team05 =  Grêmio | RD3-team06 =  Fortaleza †
| RD3-score05-1 = 2 | RD3-score06-1 = 0
| RD3-score05-2 = 2 | RD3-score06-2 = 0

| RD3-team07 =  Bahia | RD3-team08 =  Portuguesa †
| RD3-score07-1 = 0 | RD3-score08-1 = 0
| RD3-score07-2 = 2 | RD3-score08-2 = 0

| RD3-team09 =  São Paulo † | RD3-team10 =  Ponte Preta †
| RD3-score09-1 = 0 | RD3-score10-1 = 1
| RD3-score09-2 = 3 | RD3-score10-2 = 1

| RD3-team11 =  Atlético Mineiro † | RD3-team12 =  Goiás| RD3-score11-1 = 0 | RD3-score12-1 = 2
| RD3-score11-2 = 2 | RD3-score12-2 = 1

| RD3-team13 =  Coritiba † | RD3-team14 =  Paysandu
| RD3-score13-1 = 4 | RD3-score14-1 = 1
| RD3-score13-2 = 1 | RD3-score14-2 = 0

| RD3-team15 =  Botafogo | RD3-team16 =  Vitória †
| RD3-score15-1 = 1 | RD3-score16-1 = 1
| RD3-score15-2 = 1 | RD3-score16-2 = 2

| RD4-team01 =  Palmeiras | RD4-team02 =  Atlético Paranaense †
| RD4-score01-1 = 2 | RD4-score02-1 = 2
| RD4-score01-2 = 2 | RD4-score02-2 = 0

| RD4-team03 =  Grêmio | RD4-team04 =  Bahia †
| RD4-score03-1 = 2 | RD4-score04-1 = 1
| RD4-score03-2 = 2 | RD4-score04-2 = 0

| RD4-team05 =  São Paulo † | RD4-team06 =  Goiás
| RD4-score05-1 = 2 | RD4-score06-1 = 0
| RD4-score05-2 = 2 | RD4-score06-2 = 2

| RD4-team07 =  Coritiba | RD4-team08 =  Vitória †
| RD4-score07-1 = 0 | RD4-score08-1 = 0
| RD4-score07-2 = 4 | RD4-score08-2 = 1

| RD5-team01 =  Grêmio †| RD5-team02 =  Palmeiras| RD5-score01-1 = 0| RD5-score02-1 = 2
| RD5-score01-2 = 1| RD5-score02-2 = 1

| RD5-team03 =  São Paulo †| RD5-team04 =  Coritiba| RD5-score03-1 = 1| RD5-score04-1 = 0
| RD5-score03-2 = 0| RD5-score04-2 = 2

| RD6-team01 =  Palmeiras' †| RD6-team02 =  Coritiba
| RD6-score01-1 = 2| RD6-score02-1 = 0
| RD6-score01-2 = 1| RD6-score02-2 = 1
}}

First phase

Second phase

Round of 16

Quarterfinals

Semifinals
The Semifinals began on June 13 and ended on June 21.

Group 61Palmeiras advanced on points 4–1.Group 62Tied on points 3–3, Coritiba advanced on better goal difference.Finals

The Finals was played on July 5 and July 11.

Group 63Palmeiras won on points 4–1.''

Top goalscorers

References

External links
Copa Kia do Brasil
Copa do Brasil 2012, CBF.com
Official regulations 
Copa do Brasil, Soccerway.com

Copa do Brasil
2012
Copa do Brasil